Nayana James (born 18 October 1995) is an Indian athlete competing in the long jump event.

She gained a bronze medal at 2017 Asian Athletics Championships – Women's long jump while her compatriot, Neena Varakil, took silver.

Early life 
Nayana was born on 18 October 1995 in Kozhikode, a district in Kerala state, India. She was discovered by KM Peter, a former athlete, while she was a student at St. George's Higher Secondary School in Kozhikode. In 2010, Nayana shifted to the institute of the Sports Authority of India in Thalassery, Kerala to train under Jose Mathew, former coach of the renowned athlete Mayookha Johny.

Career 
Nayana shot to fame after her gold-winning performance at the 21st Federation Cup National Senior Athletics Championships at Patiala in 2017. James recorded a 6.55m jump in the long jump event, her personal best. At the 22nd Federation Cup in Patiala, Nayana continued her streak by winning another gold in the long jump event.

Nayana's 6.55m jump is among the Top 5 Indian performances in long jump event history. In 2018, she secured the 12th place in the Commonwealth Games Women's Long Jump event. At the 2018 Asian Indoors Games, Nayana bagged the silver medal with a leap of 6.08m in Women's Long Jump.

References

External links
 

Sportspeople from Kozhikode
21st-century Indian women
21st-century Indian people
Indian female long jumpers
Sportswomen from Kerala
1995 births
Living people
Athletes from Kerala
Athletes (track and field) at the 2018 Commonwealth Games
Athletes (track and field) at the 2018 Asian Games
Asian Games competitors for India
Commonwealth Games competitors for India